The DC Avanti is a coupe styled sports car produced by DC Design, an Indian design firm originally headed by Dilip Chhabria. Its name was based on the Studebaker Avanti. It was unveiled at the 2012 Auto Expo in New Delhi. The Avanti is powered by 2.0-litre four-cylinder turbocharged petrol engine producing 250 bhp with a six-speed manual transmission. A limited edition model launched in 2015 comes with 310 bhp output and paddle shifters.

Design

The car's frame is made of composite high steel and the  body consists of carbon composite, to create a strong, yet lightweight vehicle.

Interior

The interior was designed primarily with leather which is used primarily on the doors, dashboard and seats. The instrument cluster, steering wheel, and AC are all included in basic units.

Exterior

The car is available in red, white, silver, blue, orange, grey or yellow, with black stripes.

The headlamps are bi-xenon units with LED DRLS shaped like eyebrows. Foils are added at the back to boost air intake to complement a single air vent located on top. The vehicle also has a long low bonnet that dips in the middle to emphasize the DC logo.

The car has all-wheel disc brakes and 20" alloy wheels.

Engine and gearbox

It is powered by a 2-litre, 4-cylinder, turbocharged, petrol EURO-4 compliant engine, sourced from Renault. This is mated to a six-speed, dual clutch transmission, and drives the rear wheels.

Sales

The Avanti has been on sale since 2015.   According to official figures, as of December 29, 2020, 127 DC Avanti cars were sold in India and abroad.

Specifications

Engine
The Avanti uses a Renault 2 Litre Petrol Turbo Engine.

References

Sports cars